The Observatory is an art rock, experimental and electronica band based in Singapore, consisting largely of alumni from significant 1990s Singaporean bands. They are influential in the Singapore music scene. The band formed in 2001 and performed for the first time at the Baybeats music festival in December 2002. They have released eight albums: Time of Rebirth (2004), Blank Walls (2005), A Far Cry From Here (2007), Dark Folke (2009), Catacombs (2012), Oscilla (2014), Continuum (2015) and August is the Cruellest (2016). The band has performed in Norway, Italy, Japan, France, Germany and Singapore, and headlined regional music events in Malaysia and Thailand and Korea, such as MTV's Pattaya Music Festival, Heineken Fat Festival Bangkok, St Jerome's Laneway Festival and the Seoul Fringe Festival.

The Observatory is the subject of a crowd-funded experimental music documentary, The Obs: A Singapore Story, which premiered at the Singapore International Film Festival in December 2014 and travelled to the CINEDAYS Festival of European Film in Macedonia, DORF film festival in Croatia, Bare Bones International Music and Film Festival in the United States and more.

Discography

Albums

Time of Rebirth
 Released: March 2004
 Produced by The Observatory & Rennie Gomes
 Mixed by The Observatory & Rennie Gomes at members' homes and at Yellow Box Studios, Singapore

The debut album, Time of Rebirth, released in March 2004, is described by the band as "a quiet, ruminating album of poignant songs underlined by delicate textures and lush instrumentation. Delivered in hush tones over layers of subtle electronic elements blended with a distinct acoustic feel." It was written and recorded over a period of two-and-a-half years.

Reviewing the demo version of Time of Rebirth on BigO, Ivan Thomasz called it "a timely way-station on the journey of life", while critic Paul Zach praised the official album as being "so achingly, subtly gorgeous, it defies categorisation". Despite not receiving any airplay from local radio stations, 800 copies of the Time of Rebirth demo were sold, with the official album being picked up by Universal Music SIngapore for distribution, selling out its first run of 2,000 copies. Nominating Time of Rebirth as the Best Album of 2004, Razali Abdullah of Today called it "a groundbreaking album so ethereally beautiful...a local band as good as [The Observatory] comes by once a millennium." Reviewing the album in The Straits Times, Yeow Kai Chai wrote that "The Observatory invoke otherworldly beauty through a blend of electric gadgetry and classic instrumentation…gradually laying bare their emotional core while taking your breath away", while Chris Ho praised Time of Rebirth for being "[t]ender and beautiful in its intimacy".

Time of Rebirth features non-standard packaging designed by Kinetic. Rather than coming in a jewel case, it was released in the form of a diary, complete with paper-clipped photographs and torn pages. The band all had a hand in assembling the packaging. A music video for "Killing Time", directed by Royston Tan, was also released.

Blank Walls
 Released: September 2005
 Produced by The Observatory & Jorgen Traeen
 Mixed by Jorgen Traeen at Duper Studio (Bergen, Norway)

Their second album, Blank Walls, elaborates on the band’s philosophy of perpetual change, and is described by the band as "deliberately loose, eschewing particular themes and genres while embracing unconventional structures, progressive sounds and improvisatory forms, continuing an experimentation with song form, delving into greater depths of musical and lyrical tension, creating a diverse, experimental palette of words, sonic layering, and musical contrasts. The subject matter signals a mood-shift towards a more palpable intensity, exploring various themes from anger to disenchantment, from the quaint and humorous to self-mockery or plain indignation."

Today gave Blank Walls 4/5, praising The Observatory for "upp[ing] the ante by bringing in new drummer Adam Shah – who gives the band an unexpected edge – and crafting a beautiful opus that is hauntingly powerful." Complimenting The Observatory on how "the[ir] audacity can be heard in the way sounds are spliced, unwound and transplanted without warning", Yeow Kai Chai of The Straits Times wrote, "No other Singapore band, past or present, has captured the imagination quite like The Observatory. In two brief years, this experimental space-rock combo has risen from nowhere to become a premier act which everybody talks about with a kind of reverential hush."

Featuring art by Andy Yang, Blank Walls was launched on 2 September 2005 at a sold-out, lauded concert at the Recital Studio of Esplanade – Theatres on the Bay. A music video for "Olives", directed by Patrick Ong and fFurious, was also released.

A Far Cry From Here
 Released: April 2007
 Produced by Jørgen Træen and The Observatory
 Mixed & mastered by Jørgen Træen at Duper Studio (Bergen, Norway)
 Recorded by Jørgen Træen at Boss Studio (Singapore) with Philip Wong

Following on from Time of Rebirth and Blank Walls, this was The Observatory's third album in four years. The band was influenced by Soft Machine, This Heat, Tortoise, Talk Talk, Supersilent, Brian Wilson, Robert Wyatt, Nick Drake and Jaga Jazzist, whom The Observatory opened up for at the Mosaic Music Festival in 2007, amongst others. The album was described by the band as "a rich and imaginative musical vision, on which vocalist-guitarist Leslie Low builds his pensive, tender yet elliptical song-craft. The adventurous and epic exist in perfect tandem with restraint and intricacy. Exploring an ocean of sound and emotion, A Far Cry From Here should strike a chord with fans of experimental and progressive-minded classics such as Radiohead's OK Computer, Talk Talk's Spirit of Eden and Wilco's A Ghost Is Born." Unlike the process on Time of Rebirth and Blank Walls, where the band built on frontman Leslie Low's arrangements, each band member contributed ideas for songs on A Far Cry From Here.

Reviewing the album for the Singapore edition of Time Out, Chris Toh wrote that A Far Cry From Here "delves even deeper into experimental melodies and rhythms than the band's previous critically acclaimed albums". The Today review noted how A Far Cry From Here "revels in a sense of unease and is the most obvious sign yet of the band's move away from its past 'ambient candy' sound". Yeow Kai Chai of The Straits Times praised The Observatory for "delving deep and venturing into the unknown...This sense of unease, a constant calibration between heaviness and lightness, informs the way the music switches between jazzy delicacy and far-out phases of post-rock noiseniks. It's both the beauty and the beast... it's a ghostly, raw, sometimes intense soundscape with minimal overdubs to frighten off lazy lounge cats."

As with previous releases, the band chose a non-standard packaging instead of the conventional jewel case. The outer package is a small box with flap, containing a foldout multipanel slipcover with information, and a CD holder in the last section. A Far Cry From Here was launched on 14 April 2007 at Zouk.

Dark Folke
 Released: July 2009
 Produced by Jørgen Træen and The Observatory
 Recorded, Mixed & mastered by Jørgen Træen at Duper Studio (Bergen, Norway)

The fourth album was again recorded and mixed in Bergen, Norway with their longtime collaborator, Jorgen Traeen. The band describes the work as "a change in musical direction" and said "the math prog rock of The Observatory's third album A Far Cry From Here has morphed into a fluid mystical beast called Dark Folke. Most songs have no drums on them. But there is rhythm. Only the type of rhythm associated with an invisible pulse. An implied rhythm. 5 folks sitting around a fire. A metaphorical fire. Chanting for the rain to come."

"Moving away from the melodious constraints of song," Ang Song Ming writes in his review, "Dark Folke veers towards ambience – an almost asphyxiating kind", calling it the band's Kid A. Noah Berlatsky remarked in Metro Pulse on the album's combination of freak folk, drony psychedelia and near-metal. Christopher Lim of The Business Times called Dark Folke "A rich sonic feast.. a diving pool that begs to have its depths plumbed", while Christopher Toh of Today awarded the album 4 out of 5, writing that "Album No 4 for The Observatory is a great excursion into what making music in Scandinavia in the wintertime sounds like...the album is wonderfully hypnotic."

The CD album is a hardbound book, designed and drawn by metal/hardcore/underground illustrator and designer, Justin Bartlett, the artist behind the art of Sunn O))), Moss, Aura Noir and more. Dark Folke was also released on double vinyl. A music video for "Mind Roots", directed by Ler Jiyuan, was also released.

In the lead-up to the release of Dark Folke, The Observatory collaborated with filmmaker Ho Tzu Nyen and theatre director Kok Heng Leun on Invisible Room, a multimedia work for the Singapore Arts Festival featuring the band performing in an 'inverted' music space. "Invisible Room" is also the title of a Dark Folke song.

Catacombs
 Released: April 2012
 Produced by Jørgen Træen and The Observatory
 Recorded and Mixed by Jorgen Traeen
 Mastered by James Plotkin
 Design by Keith Utech
 Art by Thomas Hooper
 Offset, Letterpress Printing and Bindery by Stumptown Printers

The Observatory's fifth album, Catacombs, is described by the band as containing "a more primal, new dark wave sound...[a] study in delusion, insanity and obsession [that] provokes and inspires in a deeply enigmatic way. Even at its coldest and most abstract, it is human to the core."

Writing that "The Observatory have outdone themselves this time", X' Ho reviewed Catacombs by declaring, "Someday in the future, some pop historian is gonna look back and say – Catacombs marks the beginning of a new horizon in local music for the sheer fact that waywardness in Singapore's ultra-leftfield, alternative-rock has been deemed fetching and unanimously praised with this album." Critic Kevin Mathews praised Catacombs by calling it "an uncompromising honest work of art that expresses the deepest feelings and emotions of the artist and lays them bare for its audience to dissect, absorb and devour." my Paper described Catacombs as "dark, visceral and multi-faceted", promising that it will "get under your skin – and stay there." Yeow Kai Chai of The Straits Times awarded the album four out of five stars, comparing it to late Scott Walker and noting lyricist Leslie Low's references to Dutch occultist Johann Weyer and French philosopher Michel Foucault, writing that "the band have moved out of the mainstream into the furthest frontiers of the universe." Alia Azmi of Juice magazine noted that the album "explores a deeper, heavier sound than their previous works". In 2017, music website Bandwagon ranked Catacombs as the best The Observatory album, writing that "it stands as the band’s crowning achievement in framing primal emotions within intricate instrumentation...an incredible singular statement of artful intention and uninhibited honesty".

Featuring design by Keith Utech and art by Thomas Hooper, Catacombs was released on deluxe CD, digital and double vinyl. Catacombs was launched on 20 and 21 April 2012 at The Substation Theatre. Enter the Catacomb, a series of live sessions featuring the band performing Catacombs in its entirety in the studio, was also released.

Oscilla
 Released: August 2014
 Music composed and performed by The Observatory
 Cheryl Ong - Drums, Percussion; Dharma - Guitar; Leslie Low - Guitar, Vocal; Vivian Wang - Synth Bass, Keys, Percussion; Yuen Chee Wai - Electronics, Synth
 Lyrics by Leslie Low
 Produced by The Observatory
 Recorded live at The Black Axis, Singapore, May 2014
 Engineered by Johnny Sarcophagus 
 Mixed by Leslie Low 
 Mastered by James Plotkin
 Concept & direction by The Observatory
 Photos from "On the blue shores of silence" by Philipp Aldrup
 Typography, layout and additional photography by Yuen Chee Wai

The Observatory's sixth album, Oscilla, is described by the band as "the imagined swing of our imperfect times", featuring "vibrations of shifting rhythms, synth bass space, oscillators and abused guitars". The four songs on Oscilla were developed on a tour with Norwegian noise band MoE in Norway in 2012 and Italy in 2013, then tested on the road during a Southeast Asian tour in October and November 2013, culminating in a divisive performance at St. Jerome's Laneway Festival in Singapore. The lyrics deal with political tumult and according to the band's lyricist Leslie Low, reflect "[c]ommon people like us making a stand. Living off the grid in some way or another, (offering) criticism of existing paradigms, alternatives, the view from the ground up". The title track makes reference to Zomia, historian Willem van Schendel and James C. Scott's term for the huge mass of mainland Southeast Asia that has historically been beyond the control of governments based in the population centres of the lowlands.

Reviewing the album in Today, Kevin Mathews writes, "Oscilla is cutting-edge art that one can conceivably rock out to, which is no mean feat", awarding it full marks. Yeow Kai Chai gave the album four out of five stars, writing in The Straits Times that Oscilla "scans the deplorable state of the world, questions war and strife, and assesses the value of life. To that end, its restless, angular riffs cut and draw blood." Daniel Peters of Bandwagon observed the "politically-charged" dimension of Oscilla, writing that the "elongated hypnotic rhythms akin to krautrock and a harsh post-punk intensity...establishes Oscilla as one of the most confrontational records we've heard all year."

Featuring photographs by Philipp Aldrup, Oscilla was released on CD, digital, vinyl and cassette. Oscilla was launched on 16 and 17 August 2014 at The Substation Theatre, featuring appearances by Hanging Up the Moon's Sean Lam, Dean Aziz and former member Victor Low on back-up vocals.

Continuum
 Released: 15 July 2015
 Performed by Dharma - guitar, bass; Bani Haykal - guitar, reyong, cengceng; Vivian Wang - synth, voice; Leslie Low - Acoustic guitar, bass, drums, voice, pemade, jegogan, reyong
 Concept & direction by The Observatory
 Recorded & mixed by Leslie Low
 Mastered by James Plotkin
 Illustration by Massimiliano Amati (Redellearinghe)
 Album design by Yuen Chee Wai

Four years in the making, The Observatory's seventh album, Continuum, is their take on Indonesia's gamelan music tradition. Partially written and recorded in Lodtunduh, Bali, Continuum found The Observatory devising their own six-note scale of E, F, F#, A#, C and D#. Inspired in part by Talk Talk and Jiddu Krishnamurti, Continuum had the noise musician Lasse Marhaug contributing a remix, "Part 6", to its release. Released on double vinyl, CD and digitally, Continuum was launched at The Substation on 23 July 2015 at a launch concert with an ensemble of 10 musicians, with The Straits Times finding "the East-meets-West soundscape...hypnotic in the way it tightly enveloped the audience" at the "seamless art-rock concert[s]". Continuum was partially funded by the National Arts Council's Arts Creation Fund.

The Straits Times found Continuum a "sonically stellar mix" and "tenebrous but at the same time, musically cutting-edge and far-out", giving it four out of five stars. Time Out Singapore ranked Continuum amongst the best albums of 2015, noting that while the album is "not their best release by a long shot... this EP of gamelan music spiked with noise and doom rock deserves mad props for its bravery". Bandwagon ranked it #7 on its list of Top 10 Singapore LPs of 2015.

In February 2016, the band performed Continuum at the Performing Arts Meeting in Yokohama, Japan, directed by Aki Onda as part of a programme curated by Tang Fu Kuen. The one-night performance was supported by the National Arts Council.

August is the Cruellest
 Released: 29 February 2016
 Music composed, performed and arranged by The Observatory
 Additional instrumentation on "The Weight of It All" features Natalie Alexandra Tse on guzheng and Andy Chia on dizi 
 Recorded and mixed by Leslie Low
 Recorded at Solslottet Studios, Bergen, Norway except "August is the Cruellest" and "Brutal Blues", recorded at Black Axis & The Well, Singapore
 Mastered by James Plotkin
 Photographs by Bjorn Vaughn
 Album design by Yuen Chee Wai

Recorded in Singapore and Norway during the height of the 2015 Southeast Asian haze crisis, August is the Cruellest, inspired by King Crimson, Soft Machine, Zircon Lounge and others, is described by the band as "a work of political noise, a punishing challenge to look inward and move forward." The title track, inspired by T. S. Eliot's poem "The Waste Land", was previously performed live at theatre company Drama Box's Singapore International Festival of Arts 2015 production, The Cemetery. Writer Ng Yi-Sheng described the song as "growling rock, loud as bulldozers", another critic called it "a searing rock track... raw and loud, melancholic and frustrated, and ends with high-pitched feedback", while TODAYs Mayo Martin noted that "the music evokes anger, frustration, despair and destruction — but perhaps also the slightest trace of hope".

Reviewing the album on Bandwagon, three critics called this "proper follow-up to Oscilla" "challenging and disconcerting", "sinister, raw and explosive", and praised how the production, especially the drums, "sounds great". "Designed to grip you and shock you out of apathy and just make you think––that's the sense of hope," they noted, singling out "Everything is Vibration" and "The Weight of It All" as highlights of "their strongest album yet", giving it ratings of 8/10, 7/10 and 8.5/10. In a review of their album launch gig, Bandwagon also noted that the album "doesn't just see them at their most sonically intrusive — they're pissed off." Time Out Singapore'''s editor Iliyas Ong called August is the Cruellest a "seething, fire-breathing monster", declaring this "soundtrack for our times" "The Observatory's – and possibly the local scene's – tightest and most mature effort to date". Interviewing the band in TODAY, Kevin Mathews called August is the Cruellest a "multi-layered work", while he declared it "their most accessible of their recent releases" and "progressive rock with a conscience" that "succeeds at every level" on his blog.The Straits Times music correspondent Eddino Abdul Hadi gave the album 4/5, noting how it is "full of heartfelt anthems" and features "some of their most visceral and strident anthems to date". Eddino highlighted the songs "You Have No Heart" and "Wait For The Real Storm" as stand-outs, comparing "Low's layered harmonies" on the former to his Humpback Oak tunes. Jun Sheng Ng of Juice magazine described August is the Cruellest as an "immediate counterpoint to the prevailing spirit and sentiment widespread through the city" soon after Singapore's golden jubilee celebrations, noting that it "paints a landscape of desolation [and] the infertile and impotent wasteland we are mired in". Observing that the songs "Everything is Vibration" and "The Weight of It All" reflect the "group’s effort to return to or construct a Southeast Asian or Singaporean sound", with their quotes from Yan Jun’s poetry and use of traditional Chinese instruments like the guzheng and dizi, Ng criticised how "they are unavoidably dwarfed by the already heavy weight and influence of Eliot’s". Honeycombers praised August is the Cruellest as an "audial commentary on the looming, cataclysmic destruction of the earth" and a "revolutionary record [that] challenges a negative status quo that many have refused to acknowledge".

Released on CD, cassette, double vinyl and digitally, August is the Cruellest was launched at the band's acclaimed The Substation gigs on 18 and 19 March 2016, with special guests Dharma and SA Trio and featuring covers of The Cure and Talking Heads. On 9 March 2016, a black-and-white music video for album closer "The Weight of It All" was released.

Compilations
City Sharks: Music From the Motion Picture
 Released:  2003
 Executive Producers: Esan Sivalingam and Bratina Tay
 Music Supervisors: Vivian Wang and Esan Sivalingam

An early incarnation of The Observatory contribute two songs, "Sweetest Man" and "Coffee Break (Intermission)", to the soundtrack of this film, written and directed by Esan Sivalingam.

For Good!
 Released:  2006
 Mastered by Reece Tunbridge at Studios 301, Sydney, Australia

Rennie Gomes' remix of "This Sad Song" from The Observatory's debut album, Time of Rebirth, was included on this charity release. Proceeds from this Aging Youth Records release went to Music For Good, a non-profit organisation involved in outreach programs to youths.

+65 Indie Underground
 Released:  2009

The Observatory's "This Sad Song" from their debut album, Time of Rebirth, was collected in this three-CD compilation of Singapore indie rock, alongside tracks by Humpback Oak, The Oddfellows and Zircon Lounge.

Peter Kruder Private Collection
 Released:  2009

The Observatory's "Waste Your Life" from their debut album, Time of Rebirth, was handpicked by Peter Kruder of electronic duo Kruder & Dorfmeister for G-Stone Master Series №1: Peter Kruder Private Collection. Other acts on the compilation include Talk Talk, Tortoise, whom The Observatory opened up for at the Mosaic Music Festival in 2005, and Tom Waits.

Anatomicron
 Released:  Sep 2012

A collection of unreleased and live material, demos, covers and rarities, Anatomicron’s 13 tracks, including a Nick Drake cover, trace The Observatory's evolution through constantly changing trajectories and terrains. Anatomicron was released in support of the crowd-funded, experimental music documentary, The Obs: A Singapore Story.

Behind These Eyes: The Catacombs Remixes
 Released: Apr 2014
 Jointly released by The Observatory and Ujikaji

Featuring 11 interpretations of Catacombs songs by artists from Singapore, China, Norway, Thailand/Japan, and the US, including James Plotkin, Lasse Marhaug and Xhin. Interviewed about Behind These Eyes: The Catacombs Remixes, singer Low called the album "Eleven musical visions-lessons-perspectives. The interpretations elaborate on Catacombs' theme of madness and reach sonic territories we could never achieve on our own."

The album was reviewed positively on Midnight Shift Records' blog: "As these artists take The Observatory’s songs further into a digital register, what seemed like a highly personal album dilates into something like a genre unto itself." Reviewing the album in The Straits Times, Yeow Kai Chai wrote that Behind These Eyes: The Catacombs Remixes "meddles with the songs to spectacular effect...Overall, it's a rabbit hole to somewhere riskier and more exciting", while Bandwagon called it "stunning".

Featuring art by Mark Wong, Behind These Eyes: The Catacombs Remixes was released on double vinyl. The album was launched on 25 April 2014 at Artistry, featuring performances and DJ sets by Kiat, Xhin, George Chua and former member Evan Tan.

Split Albums and Collaborations
Gezeitentümpel | Tidal Pools
 Released: 2013

An hour-long improvisational soundtrack to photographer Philipp Aldup's 2013 exhibition, Gezeitentümpel, released as a seven-track CD-R.

i.i.i. / Mankind
 Released: June 2013
 Mixing by Leslie Low and Håvard Skaset
 Mastering by James Plotkin
 Design and album art by Lasse Marhaug

This split vinyl single with Norway's MoE features Balinese gamelan-inspired bronze instruments the band built on their song, "Mankind". Other instruments on the track include a pair of jegogan and pemade, one cengceng, and a reyong set with acoustic guitar, electric guitar, bass, drums and vocals. "Mankind" was later released on Continuum.

Shadows
 Released: 1 July 2018
 Produced by The Observatory and MoE
 Co-produced by Lasse Marhaug 
 Mixed and mastered by Lasse Marhaug
 Art direction and layout by Yuen Chee Wai

Recorded in Singapore and Norway, Shadows is a three-track collaborative album with MoE, in which both bands experiment with heavy noise rock, gamelan, and konnakol. The nearly 20-minute album alludes to the need for self-examination, wayang kulit, instincts and illusions.

Trails to the Cosmic Vibrations
 Released: 22 November 2018
 Mixed by Kawabata Makoto and Leslie Low
 Mastering by James Plotkin
 Artwork by Takahiro Kurashima
 Art direction and layout by Yuen Chee Wai

A split vinyl single with Acid Mothers Temple & The Melting Paraiso U.F.O. Acid Mothers Temple's 20-minute contribution, "Flatwoods Monster A Go Go ~ Cometary Orbital Drive 00∞00", is a Hawkwind tribute that was performed on their 2017 and 2018 tour. "Vibrational" by The Observatory was recorded at their concert at the National University of Singapore (NUS) Arts Festival 2017, featuring an orchestra of 30 guitarists from the NUS Guitar Ensemble and the university. Trails to the Cosmic Vibrations was launched with Acid Mothers Temple & The Melting Paraiso U.F.O.'s concert in Singapore on 22 November 2018.

Authority is Alive
 Released: 30 September 2020
 Mixed and mastered by Lasse Marhaug
 Cover photography by Darren Soh
 Art direction by Yuen Chee Wai

A live collaboration with the legendary Japanese avant garde musician Haino Keiji, recorded live at "The Transparency of Turbulence" Playfreely Festival, 29 November 2019, at 72-13 (Singapore). In a four-star review, NME writer Azzief Khaliq says, "Over the album’s 22 minutes, The Observatory and Keiji Haino create improvised music that showcases what talented musicians can achieve in such a setting. It’s an example of steely-eyed energy and musical alchemy, four musicians pushing each other forward and taking everything that comes out of it in their stride. The results are intoxicating, gripping, and more than a bit exhilarating."

Members
Dharma – Electric Guitar

Dharma been involved in the Singapore underground music scene since the early 1990s as a bassist and sometimes guitarist with Manic Mushroom, a guitarist with the band Heritage from 1995–1998, frontman of the local funk band, Throb, and member of Meddle, Chöd, and Tenggara Trio.

Yuen Chee Wai – Guitar, Synth, Electronics

Yuen Chee Wai has been active in the local and international experimental and improv circuit for the past two decades. He is also a part of the Far East Network (FEN) – a quartet comprising Otomo Yoshihide (Japan), Yan Jun (China) and Ryu Hankil (South Korea) since 2008. In 2015, he was appointed as Director of the Asian Music Network in Japan, which organises the annual Asian Meeting Festival, of which he is co-curator.

Cheryl Ong – Drums, Percussion, Electronics

Cheryl Ong is a Singaporean percussionist who is active in music performance and education. In addition to performing with The Observatory, she has also played with SA, a trio that fuses traditional Chinese instruments and electronics.

Past members
Leslie Low – (former member) Lead Vocals, Electric + Acoustic Guitars, Programming, Bass, Harmonica, Percussion

Former frontman of veteran local band Humpback Oak, Low was the singer, guitarist and occasional bassist in the band. He is a music composer and sound designer by profession. Low graduated from the School of Film and Media Studies at Ngee Ann Polytechnic with a Diploma in Film, Sound and Video. He has also been involved in several side projects. As PAN GU, Low's collaboration with Lasse Marhaug (electronics), Primeval Man Born of the Cosmic Egg, made it to SPIN's Top 20 Avant albums of 2013. He left The Observatory after the band released their eighth album, August is the cruellest, in 2016. He has since released multiple, mostly solo albums digitally through Bandcamp.

Vivian Wang – (former member) Vocals, Piano, keyboards, Melodica, Percussion

A classically trained pianist, Vivian Wang sang, played keyboards and generated sonic effects on laptops and synthesizer in The Observatory. Wang is a former TV presenter of the arts programme "Artitude" on local channel TV12 and also a host of Cathay Pacific's inflight series "World of Travel". A music supervisor and film producer by profession, Wang graduated with an Honours in Music. Wang is active in ARCN TEMPL, a duo with Low. Their debut Emanations of a New World (May 2010) and a web-only commemorative release Glass Blood (May 2014), were both released by American label Utech Records. Wang left the band after the release of August is the cruellest and has since worked on projects including Jenny Hval's The Practice of Love album.

Bani Haykal – (former member) Drums, Percussion, Clarinet

Born in 1985, Bani Haykal is a multidisciplinary artist whose work spans the fields of visual and literary performances, using music and sound as primary mediums. A critically reflective artist and thinker, Bani's work examines the perceptions, relevance and culture of sound and music. In 2013, Bani was awarded the Young Artist Award by Singapore's National Arts Council. Bani joined the band after the release of Catacombs and left before Oscilla, but contributed to Continuum.

Victor Low – (former member) Electric Guitar, Classical Guitar, Bass Guitar, Glockenspiel, Percussion

Victor Low is a music composer by profession, Low is an Economics graduate of Boston University. He is the former bassist of veteran local Singapore band Concave Scream. A classical guitar specialist, Low also performed on drums after Ray Aziz left the band. Low left the band after the release of Catacombs. In 2015, he recorded an instrumental album Songs of the Well inspired by his daughter's piano lessons. In 2019, Victor and former bandmate Leslie Low released The Monsoon.

Evan Tan – (former member) Programming, Keyboards, Melodica, Percussion

One-time archivist specialising in audio-visual restoration at the National Archives of Singapore. Tan toured overseas with former band The Padres during their album promotion organised by Rock Records. An active performer/programmer in the digital music scene, he released a solo album Coast to Coast previously. Tan left the band after the release of Dark Folke.

Ray Aziz – (former member) Drums, Percussion

Veteran drummer in Singapore, his former bands include Swirling Madness, Opposition Party, Sugarflies and Popland. He was concurrently also playing with Throb and The Blues Machine. Joining The Observatory during the A Far Cry From Here recording sessions, Ray contributed jazz/avant rock-styled drumming. He did not appear on Dark Folke and has since left the band. However, in 2011 he played drums for the band in a special performance commissioned by the Singapore Arts Festival to play a concert pull of reworkings of the Beatles' White Album.

Adam Shah – (former member) drums, percussion

Formerly the youngest member of the group. A sessionist since 15, Adam is musically adept at guitar and bass as well. He joined in January 2005 at 17 years of age, after successfully auditioning for the position, bringing with him a style that reflects his eclectic influences such as Bloc Party, Radiohead, Broken Social Scene, Lamb of God, Mastodon, John Coltrane, John Butler, The Mars Volta and Pat Metheny, to name a few. Adam left the band after the release of Blank Walls and before A Far Cry From Here.

References

External links
 The Observatory website
 The Observatory blog
 The Observatory on Vimeo
 POSKOD.SG Interview with frontman Leslie Low
 Leslie Low website
 NYLON SINGAPORE Video Interview with The Observatory
 Razor TV Video Interview with The Observatory

Note: Some material for this article adapted from The Observatory Press pack(zip file)'', accessed 3 March 2006

Singaporean indie rock groups
Singaporean rock music groups
Electronic music groups
Musical groups established in 2001
Musical quintets